On 7 December 1991, two trains collided inside the Severn Tunnel, between England and Wales. There were no fatalities but 185 passengers were injured.

Accident 

The 08:30 London Paddington to Cardiff Central operated by an InterCity 125 was stopped at a signal guarding the entrance to the Severn Tunnel. On telephoning the signalman according to Rule 55, the driver was advised of a signal failure and given permission to proceed slowly at caution. Three miles into the tunnel, the train was struck from behind by a Class 155 Sprinter travelling from Portsmouth to Cardiff. 185 passengers were injured, including five seriously, but none fatally.

Because track circuits were unreliable in the unusually wet tunnel environment (10 to 20 million gallons of water are pumped out per day), axle counters were used instead. The official report into the accident could not reach a firm conclusion, but speculated that the cause was either:
 an unaccountable error on the part of the Sprinter driver, or:
 technicians in the relay room at Severn Tunnel Junction had reset the axle counter while investigating the earlier signal failure fault, thus clearing the signal for the Sprinter.

References 

Train collisions in England
Train collisions in Wales
Railway accidents in 1991
1991 disasters in the United Kingdom
Tunnel disasters
Accidents and incidents involving British Rail
December 1991 events in the United Kingdom